Victor Colon Ortíz (born March 16, 1972) was the first Puerto Rican gymnast to obtain a medal in this sport in a world competition. He won a bronze medal with a score of 9.581 for the vault event in the 1992 World Artistic Gymnastics Championships. He was also the first Puerto Rican gymnast to complete in an Olympic Games, at the 1992 Summer Olympics in Barcelona.

Colon won medals at the 1991 Pan American Games and the 1995 Pan American Games.

References

External links
 
 

1972 births
Living people
People from Bayamón, Puerto Rico
Puerto Rican male artistic gymnasts
Gymnasts at the 1992 Summer Olympics
Olympic gymnasts of Puerto Rico
Medalists at the World Artistic Gymnastics Championships
Gymnasts at the 1991 Pan American Games
Gymnasts at the 1995 Pan American Games
Pan American Games silver medalists for Puerto Rico
Pan American Games bronze medalists for Puerto Rico
Pan American Games medalists in gymnastics
Medalists at the 1991 Pan American Games
Medalists at the 1995 Pan American Games
20th-century Puerto Rican people